Greerton is a major suburb of Tauranga, the largest city in the Bay of Plenty region of New Zealand. Greerton is named after Lieutenant-Colonel Henry Harpur Greer, commander of the British forces during the Battle of Gate Pā.

Demographics

Greerton had a population of 4,128 at the 2018 New Zealand census, an increase of 393 people (10.5%) since the 2013 census, and an increase of 432 people (11.7%) since the 2006 census. There were 1,671 households, comprising 1,926 males and 2,205 females, giving a sex ratio of 0.87 males per female, with 762 people (18.5%) aged under 15 years, 828 (20.1%) aged 15 to 29, 1,593 (38.6%) aged 30 to 64, and 945 (22.9%) aged 65 or older.

Ethnicities were 77.5% European/Pākehā, 20.2% Māori, 3.3% Pacific peoples, 11.0% Asian, and 1.8% other ethnicities. People may identify with more than one ethnicity.

The percentage of people born overseas was 19.9, compared with 27.1% nationally.

Although some people chose not to answer the census's question about religious affiliation, 49.6% had no religion, 31.4% were Christian, 1.5% had Māori religious beliefs, 2.8% were Hindu, 0.1% were Muslim, 0.8% were Buddhist and 4.9% had other religions.

Of those at least 15 years old, 402 (11.9%) people had a bachelor's or higher degree, and 843 (25.0%) people had no formal qualifications. 237 people (7.0%) earned over $70,000 compared to 17.2% nationally. The employment status of those at least 15 was that 1,488 (44.2%) people were employed full-time, 450 (13.4%) were part-time, and 135 (4.0%) were unemployed.

History

It was originally a small village located several kilometers south of Tauranga but was swallowed up by urban development. A military village of 125 one acre lots, the Township of Greerton, was surveyed near Gate Pā. Military settlers were allowed a choice of one acre there or a quarter acre in Te Papa. Originally, very few settlers took up town sections in Greerton.

In 1864 the Tauranga Campaign was fought in the neighbouring  suburb of Gate Pā with Māori troops withdrawing through Greerton to Pyes Pa.

Culture
The Greerton community celebrates the cherry blossom festival in the third week of September every year.

Education 

Greerton is also zoned for Tauranga Intermediate, Tauranga Boys' College and Tauranga Girls' College.

Recreation

Tauranga Racecourse | Mārawaewae is situated on Cameron Road next to Tauranga Golf Course, at the southern end of Greerton Village.

Greerton also has several parks: Greerton Park, Liston Park, Moreland Fox Park, Pemberton Park and Yatton Park.

References

Suburbs of Tauranga